Kermen is a small town in Sliven Municipality in Sliven Province, eastern Bulgaria.  it had 1727 inhabitants.

Kermen Peninsula on Robert Island, South Shetland Islands, Antarctica is named for Kermen.

Populated places in Sliven Province
Towns in Bulgaria